Opisthotropis cheni is a species of natricine snake found in China.

References

Opisthotropis
Reptiles described in 1999
Reptiles of China